The Marcos Mantara is a sports car, designed, developed and built by British manufacturer Marcos, introduced in 1992, and produced until 1999.

Background and history

In 1992 Marcos left the kit car business, all cars from this point onwards being factory built, and launched the Marcos Mantara which was sold through dealers in limited numbers. The main difference between the Mantara and the Mantula was the adoption of MacPherson strut front suspension in place of the Triumph suspension and associated trunnions. This change resulted in a wider front track, different bonnet, and flared front arches. The rear wheel arches and rear lights were also changed to give the car a more modern appearance. Power steering was also available for the first time. The Mantara was powered as standard by a 3.9-litre fuel-injected Rover V8 or a 4.6-litre Rover V8 as an optional alternative.

The Marcos GTS was a version of the Mantara powered by the 2-litre Rover Tomcat engine, on request of the Italian distributor Martes Spider Cars. The top version was the  turbo version. The GTS version of the Mantara had a slightly different bonnet incorporating much smoother lines, flared-in headlamps, and a deeper spoiler, which was used on the later Mantaray model. A handful of late Mantara V8s were produced with the same bonnet as the 2.0 litre GTS.

References

Notes

Mantara
Sports cars
Cars introduced in 1992
1990s cars
Cars of England